West Athens is one of the regional units of Greece. It is part of the region of Attica. The regional unit covers the west-central part of the agglomeration of Athens.

Administration

As a part of the 2011 Kallikratis government reform, the regional unit West Athens was created out of part of the former Athens Prefecture. It is subdivided into 7 municipalities. These are (number as in the map in the infobox):

Agia Varvara (2)
Agioi Anargyroi-Kamatero (5)
Aigaleo (6)
Haidari (34)
Ilion (18)
Peristeri (30)
Petroupoli (31)

See also
List of settlements in Attica

References

 
Regional units of Attica
2011 establishments in Greece